2 Corinthians 12 is the twelfth chapter of the Second Epistle to the Corinthians in the New Testament of the Christian Bible. It is authored by Paul the Apostle and Timothy (2 Corinthians 1:1) in Macedonia in 55–56 CE.

Text
The original text was written in Koine Greek. This chapter is divided into 21 verses.

Textual witnesses
Some early manuscripts containing the text of this chapter are:
Papyrus 46 (~AD 200)
Codex Vaticanus (325–350)
Codex Sinaiticus (330–360)
Codex Alexandrinus (400–440)
Codex Freerianus (~450; extant verses 6–7,14–15)
Codex Claromontanus (~550)

Verse 2
 I know a man in Christ who fourteen years ago – whether in the body I do not know, or whether out of the body I do not know, God knows – such a one was caught up to the third heaven.

"I know a man in Christ": refers to Paul himself, as he speaks in the first person in 2 Corinthians 12:7. Paul speaks in the third person to show his humility and modesty. He says himself a "man", not to distinguish from an angel or any other creature; maybe only to express his gender (the Syriac version uses a distinct masculine word) or just to denote a person.
 "Fourteen years ago": could refer either to the time of Paul's conversion or the time of his rapture, which could be in the period of the three days after the conversion, when he was blind, didn't eat nor drink, or many years after the conversion. Most probably, it was not in Damascus, but when Paul was again in Jerusalem, while praying in the temple, and was in a trance (Acts 22:17). Lightfoot places Paul's conversion in 34 AD, the rapture into the third heaven in 43, at the time of the famine during the reign of Claudius, when he was in a trance in Jerusalem (Acts 22:17), and the writing of this epistle in 57. Bishop Usher puts the conversion in 35, his rapture in 46, and the writing of this epistle in 60.
"The third heaven": that is so-called "the seat of the divine Majesty, and the residence of the holy angels", in comparison to the "airy" and "starry" heavens. Paul refers to a distinction in the Jewish belief of "the supreme heaven, the middle heaven, and the lower heaven".
"Whether in the body I cannot tell, or whether out of the body I cannot tell, God knows": Either similar to Elijah who was carried with soul and body in a chariot with horses of fire; or as Moses was disembodied for a time, or in a visionary way, as John was "in the Spirit" on the Lord's day, and Ezekiel was taken by a lock of his head, lifted up by the Spirit between earth and heaven, and brought "in the visions of God to Jerusalem", it cannot be ascertained as Paul himself did not know.

Verse 7

 And lest I should be exalted above measure by the abundance of the revelations, a thorn in the flesh was given to me, a messenger of Satan to buffet me, lest I be exalted above measure.

See also 
Satan
Third Heaven
Thorn in the flesh
Titus
 Related Bible parts: Genesis 1, Hosea 2, Daniel 7, Acts 22, Romans 8, Philippians 4

Notes

References

Sources

External links
 King James Bible - Wikisource
English Translation with Parallel Latin Vulgate
Online Bible at GospelHall.org (ESV, KJV, Darby, American Standard Version, Bible in Basic English)
Multiple bible versions at Bible Gateway (NKJV, NIV, NRSV etc.)

2 Corinthians 12